The 22nd Annual British Academy Television Craft Awards are presented by the British Academy of Film and Television Arts (BAFTA) and were held on 24 May 2021. The nominees were announced on 28 April 2021. The ceremony was hosted by Gbemisola Ikumelo.

Rule changes
In October 2020, BAFTA announced several changes in some categories the craft awards and the general ceremony
 The category Best Breakthrough Talent was renamed and divided into two categories, Best Emerging Talent: Factual and Best Emerging Talent: Fiction.

Winners and nominees
Winners are first and highlighted in boldface.

See also
2021 British Academy Television Awards

References

External links
Official website

2021 television awards
2020 in British television
British Academy Television Craft Awards
2021